Centralna energoremontna baza is one of the largest enterprises on the Balkans focused on large electric power facilities maintenance in the energy industry. It is one of the oldest energy organizations in Bulgaria. It was set up in 1948.

Activities 

CERB has specialized in manufacturing, diagnostics, maintenance and repair of all kinds of rotating electrical machines and transformers. CERB is the only organization in Bulgaria to transport heavy and oversized load with its own railroad wagon.

Projects 

The Bulgarian enterprise maintain the electrical facilities of Bulgarian National Electrical Company (NEK EAD), Electricity System Operator (ESO), Energo-Pro, ČEZ, Mini Maritsa Iztok, LUKOIL Neftochim Burgas. It implements projects in the largest energy plants on the Balkans, including Public Power Corporation of Greece, METKA –Greece, ELEM Macedonia, KEK Kosovo, Elektroprivreda BiH- Bosnia and Herzegovina, Energo-Pro – The Czech Republic, among many others.

Production facilities 

The company’s capacities are located on 20 000 sq m area, including: 4 main manufacturing buildings (department for rotating electrical machines, transformers, transport and mechanical department); 2 laboratories (for analyzing and testing of transformers oil and control of metals centre); department for vibration analyses and dynamic balancing; as well as vocational training centre of welders.

Management and employees 

Chairman of the Board of Directors of CERB is the Bulgarian energy expert and engineer Dimiter Beleliev. He has more than 15 years of management experience in the energy sector. As of  January 2014, CERB employs a staff of more than 150 engineers, technicians and other specialists.

Background 

1948 CERB was set up in Sofia  
1948 The electrical machines repair workshop opened 
1956 The transformers repair workshop opened 
1956 The mechanical workshop opened  
1965 The transport department was set up  
1975 The centre for welding and control of metals, the specialized sections for vibration analysis and dynamic balancing of rotating machines, and adjustment of the regulation of steam turbines was founded  
1994 CERB became a joint stock company  
2001 CERB was privatized

References

External links 

 
 METKA Greece Official Website
 Elektroprivreda BiH Official Website
 KEK Kosovo Energy Corporation Official Website
 ELEM Macedonian Power Plants Official Website

1948 establishments in Bulgaria
Electrical engineering companies
Engineering companies of Bulgaria
Companies based in Sofia